This list of the Paleozoic life of Iowa contains the various prehistoric life-forms whose fossilized remains have been reported from within the US state of Iowa and are between 538.8 and 252.17 million years of age.

A

 †Abatocrinus
 †Acidaspis
 †Aclisina
  †Actinocrinites
 †Actinocrinites gibsoni
 †Actinocrinites jugosus
 †Actinocrinites lowei
 †Actinocrinites pernodosus
 †Actinocrinites probolos
 †Actinopteria – tentative report
 †Actinostroma
 †Actinostroma clathratum
 †Acutatheca
 †Acutatheca propira
 †Adocetocystis
 †Adolfia
 †Aechmina
 †Aechmina cuspidata
 †Aechmina ionensis
 †Aechmina maquiketensis
 †Aechmina taurea
 †Agassizodus
 †Agassizodus variabilis
 †Agelacrinites
 †Aglaocrinus
 †Aglaocrinus compactus
 †Allanella
 †Allanella allani
 †Allanella annae
 †Allanella cardinalis
 †Allenella
 †Allenella allani
 †Allenella annae
 †Allocrinus
 †Allocrinus ornatus
 †Allocrinus subglobosus
 †Allorhynchus
 †Allorhynchus currei – or unidentified comparable form
 †Allozygocrinus
 †Allozygocrinus dubuquensis
 †Alveolites
 †Ambocoelia
 †Ambocoelia louisianaensis
 †Ambocoelia minuta
 †Ambonychia
 †Americoncha
 †Americoncha marginata
 †Amphicoelia
 †Amphicyrtoceras
 †Amphipora
 †Amphipora pervesiculata
 †Amplexus
 †Anartiocystis
 †Anastrophia
 †Anataphrus
 †Anematina
 †Anematina conica
 †Angyomphalus
 †Angyomphalus lens
 †Angyomphalus penelenticulata – type locality for species
 †Anisotrypa
 †Anomphalus
 †Anthracospirifer
 †Anthracospirifer pellaensis
 †Antiquatonia
 †Antirhynchonella
 †Antirotella
 †Antirotella kindlei – type locality for species
 †Aorocrinus
 †Aparchites
 †Aparchites barbatus
 †Aparchites carinatus
 †Aparchites chatfieldensis
 †Aparchites ellipticus
 †Aparchites fimbriatus
 †Aparchites macrus
 †Aparchites paratumida
 †Aphelecrinus
 †Apycnodiscus
 †Arabellites
 †Arachnophyllum
 †Archaeocalyptocrininus
 †Archaeocalyptocrininus iowensis
 †Archaeocalyptocrininus nodosus
 †Archaeocalyptocrinus
 †Archaeocalyptocrinus iowensis
 †Archaeocalyptocrinus nodosus
 †Archaeocrinus
 †Archaeocrinus obconicus
 †Archaeogastropod
 †Archinacella
 †Archinacella rotunda
  †Arctinurus
 †Arctomeristina
 †Arisaigia
 †Arrectocrinus
 †Arrectocrinus iowensis
 †Arthroxylon
 †Asphaltinella
 †Asterophyllites
 †Asterophyllites multifolia
 †Asthenophyllum
 †Astraeospongium
 †Astreptodictya
 †Astrocystites
 †Astrocystites ottawaensis – tentative report
 †Atelodictyon
 †Atelodictyon masoncityense – type locality for species
 †Athyris
 †Athyris cedarensis
 †Athyris crassicardinalis
 †Athyris fultonensis – or unidentified comparable form
 †Athyris simplex
 †Athyris spiriferiodes
 †Athyris vitatta
 †Athyris vittata
 †Athyris zonulata
 †Atribonium
 †Atribonium nora
 †Atribonium paupera
 †Atribonium prolifica
 †Atribonium subovata
 †Atribonium swallovi
 †Atrypa
  †Atrypa reticularis
 †Atrypa reticularus
 †Atryparia
 †Atryparia varicostata
 †Atrypoidea
 †Aulacella
 †Aulocopella
 †Aulocopella dactylos – type locality for species
 †Aulocopella probolos – type locality for species
 †Aulocopella scelidos – type locality for species
  †Aviculopecten
 †Aviculopecten marbuti – or unidentified comparable form

B

 Bairdia
 †Bairdiocypris
 †Bairdiocypris granti
 †Bairdocypris
 †Bairdocypris granti
 †Basseleratia
 †Basseleratia typa
 †Bassleratia
 †Bassleratia typa
 †Batostomella
 †Baylea
 †Baylea trifibra – type locality for species
 †Beecheria
 †Beecheria chouteauensis
 †Belemnocrinus
  †Bellerophon
 †Bellerophon blairi
 †Bellerophon panneus
 †Bellerophon patersoni
 †Bellerophon vinculatus
 †Bellornatia
 †Bellornatia tricollis
 †Belodina
 †Belodina compressa
 †Beloitoceras – tentative report
 †Beloitoceras discrepana
 †Bembexia
 †Bembexia minima
 †Bensbergia
 †Bensbergia pulchra – type locality for species
 †Beyrichia
 †Beyrichia irregularis
 †Bighornia
 †Blothrocrinus
 †Bobbodus
 †Bobbodus schaefferi
 †Bolicrinus
 †Bolicrinus deflatus
 †Bolicrinus globosus
 †Bollia
 †Bollia regularis
 †Bollia ruthae
 †Bollia subaequata
  †Bothriocidaris
 †Bothriocidaris maquoketensis
 †Botryocrinus
 †Botryocrinus thomasi – type locality for species
 †Brachythyris
 †Brachythyris burlingtonensis – or unidentified comparable form
 †Brachythyris chouteauensis
 †Brachythyris peculiaris
 †Brachytomaria
 †Brachytomaria semele
 †Breviphillipsia
 †Brockocystis
 †Brockocystis nodosaria
 †Bromidella
 †Bromidella depressa
 †Bromidella rhomboides
 †Bryantodina
 †Bryantodina typicalis
 †Bucanella
 †Bucanella conradi
 †Bucanopsis
 †Bucanopsis lirata
 †Bullatekka
 †Bullatekka granilabiatus
 †Bullatella
 †Bullatella granilabiatus
  †Bumastus
 †Buranella
 †Buxtonia – tentative report
 †Byrsolopsina
 †Byrsolopsina centipunctata
 †Byrsolopsina normella
 †Byrsolopsina ovata
 †Byrsolopsina planilateralis
 Bythocypris
 †Bythocypris curta
 †Bythocypris furnishi

C

 †Caenanoplia
 †Caenanoplia logani
 †Calamocarpon
 †Calamocarpon insignis
 †Calceocrinus
 †Calceocrinus levorsoni
 †Calcisphaera
 †Calcisphaera laevis
 †Calliocrinus
 †Calliocrinus longispinus
 †Callocrinus
 †Callocrinus longispinus
 †Callocystites
 †Calvinaria
 †Calvinaria ambigua
 †Calvinaria bransoni
 †Calvustrigis – tentative report
  †Calymene
 †Camarophorella
 †Camarophorella lenticularis
 †Camarotoechia
 †Camarotoechia chemungensis
 †Camarotoechia chouteauensis
 †Camarotoechia crassiplicata
 †Camarotoechia perplexa
 †Camarotoechia quadricostatum
 †Camarotoechia saxatilis
 †Camarotoechia saxatillis
 †Camarotoechia tuta
 †Camerella
 †Carabocrinus
 †Carabocrinus radiatus
 †Carabocrinus slocomi
 †Cardiola
 †Cardiola lyoni
 †Carinatrypa
 †Carinatrypa dysmorphstrota
 †Cariniferella
 †Cariniferella iowensis
 †Carpocrinus
 †Carpocrinus bodei
 †Caryocrinites
  †Catenipora
 †Ceratocephala
 †Ceratopsis
 †Ceratopsis humilinoda
 †Ceratopsis quadrifida
 †Ceratopsis trilobis
  †Ceraurus
 †Cerithioides
 †Cerithioides judiae
 †Characterophyllum
 †Characterophyllum nanum
 †Charactoceras
 †Charactophyllum
 †Charactophyllum nanum
 †Charionella
 †Charionella nortoni
  †Cheirurus
 †Chomatodus
 †Chomatodus inconstans
 †Chonetes
 †Chonetes glenparkensis
 †Chonetes illinoisensis
 †Chonetes logani
 †Chonetes multicosta
 †Chonetes multicostata
 †Chonetes ornatus
 †Chonetina
 †Chonetinella
 †Chonetipustula
 †Chonetipustula concentrica
 †Chonopectus
 †Chonopectus fischeri
 †Chonophyllum
 †Clathrocoilona
 †Clathrocoilona involuta – type locality for species
 †Clathrodictyon
 †Cleiocrinus
 †Cleiocrinus regius
  †Cleiothyridina
 †Cleiothyridina crassicardinalis – or unidentified related form
 †Cleiothyridina glenparkensis – or unidentified comparable form
 †Cleiothyridina incrassata – or unidentified comparable form
 †Cleiothyridina sublamellosa
 †Climacoconus
 †Climacoconus pumilus
  †Climacograptus
 †Climacograptus pumilis
 †Climacograptus typicalis
 †Clinolithes
 †Clinopistha
 †Clintonella – tentative report
 †Clorinda
 †Cochliodus
 †Cochliodus occidentalis
 †Coelospira
 †Coeloterorhynchus
 †Coeloterorhynchus schucherti
 †Coeloterorhynchus subacuminata
 †Coeloterorhynchus subacuminatus
 †Coenites
  †Composita
 †Composita humilis – tentative report
 †Composita immatura – or unidentified comparable form
 †Composita trinuclea
 †Compsocrinus
 †Concavicaris
 †Concavicaris sinuata – or unidentified comparable form
 †Conocardium
 †Conotreta
 †Conularia
 †Coolinia
  †Cornulites
 †Costistricklandia
 †Costistricklandia castellana
 †Costistricklandia multilirata
 †Cotylacrina
 †Cotylacrina sandra
 †Cranaena
 †Cranaena amana
 †Cranaena arcuosa
 †Cranaena calvini
 †Cranaena depressa
 †Cranaena elia
 †Cranaena famelica
 †Cranaena inflata
 †Cranaena infrequens
 †Cranaena iowensis
 †Cranaena jacunda
 †Cranaena lata
 †Cranaena littleonensis
 †Cranaena littletonensis
 †Cranaena maculata
 †Cranaena marsii
 †Cranaena micula
 †Cranaena navicella
 †Cranaena occidentalis
 †Cranaena pachytesta
 †Cranaena parvirostra
 †Cranaena rhomboidialis
 †Cranaena rockfordensis
 †Cranaena romingeri
 †Cranaena seminula
 †Cranaena subcylindrica
 †Cranaena subglobosa
 †Cranaena subglossa
 †Cranaena subgobulosa
 †Cranaena subouata
 †Cranaena subovata
 †Cranaena thomasi
 †Cranaenella
  †Crania
 †Crania famelica
 †Crassiproetus
 †Crassiproetus arietinus
 †Crassiproetus bumastoides
 †Crassiproetus occidens
 †Crassiproetus searighti
 †Cremacrinus
 †Cremacrinus gerki
 †Cremacrinus guttenbergensis
 †Cremacrinus punctatus – or unidentified related form
 †Cremacrinus type locality for species – informal
 †Cribanocrinus
 †Crotalocrinintes
  †Crotalocrinites
 †Crurithyris
 †Cryptophyllus
 †Cryptophyllus oboloides
 †Cryptophyllus sulcatus
 †Ctenobolbina
 †Ctenobolbina emaciata
 †Ctenobolbina maquoketensis
 †Ctenodonta
 †Ctenodonta anatina
 †Ctenodonta calvini
 †Cupularostrum
 †Cupularostrum contracta
 †Cupularostrum saxatilis
 †Cupularostrum saxatillis
 †Cupulocorona
 †Cupulocrinus
 †Cupulocrinus angustatus
 †Cupulocrinus conjugans – or unidentified related form
 †Cupulocrinus crossmani
 †Cupulocrinus latibrachiatus – or unidentified related form
 †Curtognathus
 †Cusacrinus
 †Cyathaxonia
 †Cyathaxonia arcuatus
  †Cyathocrinites
 †Cyathocrintes
 †Cyathocrintes striatissimus – or unidentified comparable form
 †Cyathophyllum
 †Cyclendoceras
 †Cyclocrinites
 †Cyclocrinites dactilioides
 †Cyclocrinites dactioloides
 †Cyclocystoides
 †Cyclonema
 †Cyclonema bilix
 †Cyclonema minuta
 †Cyclora
 †Cynopodius
   †Cyphaspis
 †Cypricardella
 †Cypricardinia
 †Cypricardinia sulcifera
 †Cyrtia
 †Cyrtia exporrecta
 †Cyrtina
 †Cyrtina inulta
 †Cyrtina iowaensis
 †Cyrtina triquetra
 †Cyrtina umbonata
 †Cyrtodonta
 †Cyrtolites
 †Cyrtospira
  †Cyrtospirifer
 †Cyrtospirifer disjunctus
 †Cyrtospirifer whitneyi
 †Cystiphyllum
 †Cystiphyllum mundulum
 †Cystodictya
 †Cytocrinus

D

 †Dalejina
 †Dalmanella
 †Dalmanella edgewoodensis – or unidentified comparable form
   †Dalmanites
 †Dapsilodus
 †Dapsilodus mutatus
 †Dawsonoceras
  †Decadocrinus
 †Decadocrinus crassidactylus – type locality for species
 †Decadocrinus pachydactylus – type locality for species
 †Decadocrinus spinulifer – type locality for species
 †Decaschisma
 †Dechenella
 †Dechenella haldemani – or unidentified comparable form
 †Dechenella nortoni
 †Dechenella prouti
 †Dechenella rowi – or unidentified comparable form
  †Deiphon
 †Delocrinus
 †Delocrinus vulgatus
 †Deltaherpeton – type locality for genus
 †Deltaherpeton hiemstrae – type locality for species
 †Delthyris – tentative report
 †Deltodus
 †Deltodus spatulatus
 †Dendrocrinus
 †Dendrocrinus casei
 †Dendrocrinus curvijunctus – or unidentified related form
 †Dendrocrinus oswegoensis
  †Dentalium
 †Dentalium grandaevum
 †Derbyia
 †Desquamatia
 †Desquamatia brandonensis
 †Desquamatia independensis
 †Desquamatia randalia
 †Desquamatia rotunda
 †Desquamatia rusica
 †Desquamatia scutiformis
 †Desquamatia waterlooensis
 †Devonatrypa
 †Devonatrypa brandonensis
 †Devonatrypa pronis
 †Devonatrypa trowbridgei
 †Devonatrypa waterlooensis
 †Devonochonetes
 †Devonochonetes calivini
 †Devonoproductus
 †Devonoproductus reticulocostus
 †Devonoproductus vulgaris
 †Devonoproductus walcotti
 †Diamphidiocystis
 †Diceromyonia
 †Dichacaenia
 †Dichacaenia harberti
 †Dichocrinus
 †Dicoelosia
 †Dicranella
 †Dicranella bicornis
 †Dicranella marginata
 †Dicranella simplex
 †Dicranella spinosa
 †Dicranella typa
 †Dicranopeltis
 †Dictyoclostus
 †Dictyotomaria
 †Dictyotomaria quasicapillaria – type locality for species
 †Dielasma
 †Dielasma burlingtonensis
 †Dielasma chouteauensis
 †Dielasma formosum
 †Dimerocrinites
 †Dimerocrinites hopkintonensis
 †Dimerocrinites pentangularis
 †Dimerocrinites sculptus
 †Dinobolus
 †Dinolobus
 †Dinorthis
 †Diopatraites
 †Diphyphyllum
 †Diploblastus
 †Diploblastus glaber
  †Diplograptus
 †Diplograptus modestus – or unidentified comparable form
 †Diplophyllum
 †Diplosphaerina
 †Diplosphaerina inaequalis
 †Discosorus
 †Disphyllum
 †Disphyllum conjugans – type locality for species
 †Disphyllum dispassum
 †Disphyllum floydense
 †Disphyllum iowensis – type locality for species
 †Disphyllum tubiforme
 †Dolerorthis
 †Donaldina – tentative report
 †Dorycrinus
 †Dorycrinus gouldi
 †Dorycrinus mississippiensis
 †Douvillina
 †Douvillina arcuata
 †Douvillina cayuta
 †Douvillina delicata
 †Douvillina distans
 †Douvillina maxima
 †Douvillina navicula
 †Douvillina oxycostratum
 †Douvillina variabilis
 †Douvillinaria
 †Douvillinaria delicata
 †Douvillinaria perversa
 †Douvillinaria variabilis
 †Douvillinaria variablis
 †Drepanoistodus
 †Drepanoistodus suberectus
 †Dudleyaspis
 †Dvorakia
 †Dvorakia chattertoni – type locality for species

E

 †Earlandia
 †Ecclimadictyon
 †Ecclimadictyon fastigiatum
 †Echinocoelia
 †Echinocoelia halli
 †Echinoconchus
 †Ectenocrinus
 †Ectenocrinus raymondi
 †Ectenocrinus simplex
 †Ectodemites
 †Ectodemites primus
 †Ectogrammysia
 †Ectogrammysia hannibalensis
   †Edestus
 †Edestus crenulata
 †Edestus mirus – type locality for species
 †Edmondia
 †Edmondia jejunus
  †Eldredgeops
 †Eldredgeops rana
 †Eleutherokomma
 †Eleutherokomma jasperensis
 †Elita
 †Elita diversa
 †Elita inconsueta
 †Elita johnsonensis
 †Elita minor
 †Elita subundifera
 †Elita urbana
 †Ellesmeria
 †Ellesmeria scobeyi
 †Ellesmeroceras
 †Ellesmeroceras luthei
 †Ellesmeroceras thomasi
 †Emanuella
 †Emanuella ii – report made of unidentified related form or using admittedly obsolete nomenclature
 †Emanuella meristoides
 †Emanuella sublineata
 †Emphereaster
 †Emphereaster missouriensis
  †Encrinurus
   †Endoceras
 †Endostaffella
 †Endostaffella discoidea
 †Endothyra
 †Endothyra obsoleta – tentative report
 †Endothyranella
 †Enoploura
 †Enoploura wetherbyi
 †Enteletes
 †Entelophyllum
 Eocaudina
 †Eocaudina septaforaminalis – type locality for species
 †Eochonetes
 †Eochonetes aspera
 †Eochonetes dignata – type locality for species
 †Eochonetes recedens
 †Eodictyonella
 †Eolissochonetes
 †Eomartiniopsis
 †Eomartiniopsis rostrata
 †Eoparisocrinus
 †Eoparisocrinus crossmani
 †Eophacops
 †Eoplectodonta
 †Eoschmidtella
 †Eoschmidtella umbonata
 †Eospirifer
 †Eospirifer radiatus
 †Eospirigerina
 †Eospirigerina putilla – or unidentified comparable form
 †Eostrophalosia
 †Eostrophalosia independensis
 †Eostrophalosia inexpectans
 †Eostrophalosia rockfordensis
 †Eosyringothyris
 †Eosyringothyris aspera
 †Eosyringothyris occidentalis
 †Eosyringothyris thomasi
 †Eosyringothyris triangularis
 †Ephippiorthoceras
 †Eridoconcha
 †Eridoconcha gibbera
 †Eridoconcha punctata
 †Eridotrypa
 †Erismacanthus
 †Erismacanthus barbatus
 †Erismodus
 †Erismodus radicans
 †Escharopora
   †Eucalyptocrinites
 †Eucalyptocrinites depressus
 †Eucalyptocrinites inornatus
 †Eucalyptocrinites ornatus – or unidentified comparable form
 †Eucalyptocrinites proboscidalis
 †Eukloedenella
 †Eukloedenella richmondensis
 †Eumetria
 †Eumetria iowensis
 †Eumetria osagensis
 †Eumorphocystis
 †Eunema
 †Eunema quadrisulcata
  †Euomphalus
 †Euomphalus angularis
 †Euomphalus obtusus
 †Euphemites
 †Euphemites lentiformis
 †Euphemites urei
 †Euprimitia
 †Euprimitia celata
 †Euprimitia flores
 †Euprimitia labiosa
 †Euprimitia linepunctata
 †Euprimitia minuta
 †Euprimitia sanctipauli
 †Euptychocrinus
 †Euptychocrinus skopaios
 †Eurychilina
 †Eurychilina incurva
 †Eurychilina minutifoveata
 †Eurychilina partifimbriata
 †Eurychilina reticulata
 †Eurychilina subradiata
 †Eurychilina ventrosa
 †Eutaxocrinus
 †Eutaxocrinus gracilis
 †Exocrinus
 †Exocrinus multirami

F

 †Fardenia – tentative report
  †Favosites
 †Fenestella
 †Fenestrellina
 †Ferganella
 †Fistulipora
 †Flabellitesia
 †Flabellitesia flabellites
  †Flexicalymene
 †Floweria
 †Floweria altirostris
 †Floweria orthoplicata
 †Floweria prava
 †Floyda
 †Floyda concentrica
 †Fourstonella

G

 †Galateacrinus
 †Galateacrinus gossameri
 †Gilmocrinus
 †Girtyella
 †Girtyella indianse
 †Glabrocingulum
 †Glabrocingulum angulosa – type locality for species
 †Glabrocingulum minutum – type locality for species
 †Glaphyrites
 †Glossites
 †Glyptorthis
 †Glyptorthis pulchra – type locality for species
 †Glyptorthis subcircularis – type locality for species
 †Gomphocystites
  †Goniatites
 †Goniocrinus
 †Goniophyllum
 †Goniophyllum pyramidale
 †Gorgonophontes
 †Gorgonophontes peleron
 †Graffhamicrinus
 †Graffhamicrinus magnijkus
 †Graffhamicrinus subcoronatus
 †Grammysia
 †Grammysia amygdalinus
  †Gravicalymene
  †Greenops
 †Greenops barrisi
 †Greenops fitzpatricki
  †Grewingkia
 †Gypidula
 †Gypidula cornuta
 †Gypidula munda
 †Gypidula occidentalis
 †Gypidula papyracea
 †Gypidula parva
 †Gypidulina
 †Gyroceras

H

 †Hadrorhynchia
 †Hadrorhynchia solon
 †Haeretocrinus
 †Haeretocrinus missouriensis
 †Hagnocrinus
 †Hallatia
 †Hallatia convexa
 †Hallatia duplicata
 †Hallatia particylincrica
 †Hallatia particylindrica
 †Hallicystis
 †Halliella
 †Halliella magnipunctata
   †Hallopora
 †Halysiocrinus
 †Halysiocrinus barrisi
 †Halysiocrinus elephantinus – type locality for species
   †Halysites
 †Hammatostroma
 †Hammatostroma albertense
 †Harpidella – tentative report
 †Harpidella brandonensis
 †Harpidium
 †Harpidium luckeyensis – or unidentified related form
 †Harpidium maquoketa
 †Hedeina
 †Heliolites
  †Heliophyllum
 †Heliophyllum solidum
 †Helliella
 †Helliella magnipunctata
 †Hemicystites
 †Hemiphragma
 †Hemiplethorhynchus
 †Hemiplethorhynchus subovatum
 †Hermatostroma
 †Hermatostroma polymorphum
 †Hernodia
 †Hesperidella
 †Hesperidella initialis
  †Hexagonaria
 †Hexagonaria bassleri
 †Hexagonaria inequalis
 †Hexagonaria oweni
 †Hexagonaria whitfieldi
 †Hibbardella
 †Hibbardella subacoda
 †Hindella
 †Hindia
 †Hindia parva – tentative report
 †Hindia sphaeroidalis
 †Holcocrinus
  †Holopea
 †Holopea iowaensis
 †Homacanthus
 †Homacanthus delicatulus
 †Homoeospira
 †Homotrypella
 †Hormotoma
 †Hormotoma gracilis
 †Howellella
 †Hudsonaster
 †Huronia
 †Hustedia
 †Hyattidina
 †Hybocrinus
 †Hybocrinus conicus
 
 †Hyolithes
 †Hyolithes parviusculus
 †Hypergonia
 †Hypergonia percarinata
 †Hypothyridina
 †Hypothyridina emmonsi
 †Hypothyridina intermedia
 †Hypothyridina magister
 †Hypselocrinus
 †Hypsitycha
 †Hypsitycha hybrida
 †Hysitycha
 †Hysitycha neenah
 †Hystriculina

I

 †Ianthinopsis
 †Ianthinopsis pinguis – type locality for species
 †Icriodus
 †Icriodus calvini – type locality for species
 †Icriodus latericrescens
 †Icriodus nodosus
 †Icriodus orri – type locality for species
 †Icriodus subterminus
 †Icthyocrinus
 †Idiognathodus
 †Idiognathodus attenuatus – type locality for species
 †Idiognathodus claviformis
 †Idiognathodus iowaensis – type locality for species
 †Ignoceras
 †Ignoceras undata
 †Indospirifer
 †Indospirifer orestes
  †Iniopteryx
 †Iniopteryx rushlaui
 †Iniopteryx tedwhitei
  †Iocrinus
 †Iowacystis
 †Iowacystis sagittaria
 †Iowaphyllum
 †Iowaphyllum johanni
 †Iowatrypa
 †Iowatrypa americana
 †Iowatrypa owenensis
 †Ischadites
 †Isorthis
 †Isorthoceras
 †Isorthoceras sociale
  †Isotelus

J

 †Juresania

K

 †Kaskia
 †Kayoceras
 †Kiesowia
 †Kiesowia binoda
 †Kiesowia insolens
 †Kinocrinus
 †Kinocrinus inflatus
  †Kionoceras
 †Kionoceras decorahense – type locality for species
 †Kirkidium
 †Kitikamispira – tentative report
 †Kitikamispira perstrialis – type locality for species
 †Knightella
 †Knightella shumardiana – type locality for species
 †Kosovopeltis
 †Kosovopeltis acamas
 †Krausella
 †Krausella arcuata
 †Krausella curtispina
 †Krausella inaequalis
 †Krinocrinus
 †Krinocrinus inflatus

L

 †Laccoprimitia
 †Laccoprimitia elegantula
 †Laccoprimitia fillmorensis
 †Lacertasterias – type locality for genus
 †Lacertasterias elegans – type locality for species
 †Laddella
 †Laddella insueta
 †Ladogioides
 †Ladogioides solon
 Laevidentalium
 †Lamottia
 †Lamottia heroensis
 †Lampterocrinus
 †Lanecrinus – tentative report
 †Leangella
 †Lecanocrinus
 †Lecathylus
 †Lecathylus gregarius
 †Lechritochoceras
 †Leioclema
 †Leioclema occidens
 †Leiorhynchus
 †Leiorhynchus argenteum
 †Leiorhynchus gosseleti
 †Leiorhynchus iris
 †Leperditella
 †Leperditella dorsicornis
 †Leperditella fryei
 †Leperditella macra
 †Leperditella millepunctata
 †Leperditella persimilis
 †Leperditella sacceliformis
 †Leperditia
 †Lepidocyclus
 †Lepidoleptaena – or unidentified related form
 †Leptaena
 †Leptaena rhomboidalis
 †Leptagonia
 †Leptagonia analoga
 †Leptellina
 †Leptobolus
 †Leptobolus occidentalis
 †Leptodesma
 †Leptodesma acutilaris
 †Leptodesma subovata
 †Leptopora
 †Leptopora typa
 †Leptoptygma
 †Leptoptygma oligospira – type locality for species
 †Leptostrophia – tentative report
 †Leptotrypella
 †Lichenalia
 †Lichenocrinus
  †Lingula
 †Lingula changi
 †Lingula cuneata
 †Lingula fragila
 †Lingula milwaukeensis – or unidentified comparable form
 †Lingula milwaukiensis
 †Lingulodiscina
 †Lingulodiscina marginalis
 †Linocrinus
 †Linoporella
 †Linoproductus
 †Linoproductus ovatus
 †Liospira
 †Liospira micula
 †Liospira spicula – or unidentified comparable form
 †Litostrobus
 †Litostrobus iowensis
 †Litostrobus paulus
 †Lonchodus – tentative report
 †Lophophyllidium
 †Lophospira
 †Lophospira depauperata
 †Lorangerella
 †Lorangerella gregaria
 †Loxonema
 †Lumbriconereites
 †Luxocrinus
 †Luxocrinus simplex
 †Lyonicrinus
 †Lyriocrinus
 †Lysocystites
 †Lysocystites nodosus
 †Lytospira

M

 †Macgeea
 †Macgeea camplanulata – type locality for species
 †Macgeea concinnula – type locality for species
 †Macgeea culmula
 †Macgeea solitaria
 †Macrocrinus
 †Macrocrinus mundulus
 Macrocypris
 †Macrocypris kayi
 †Macrocyproides
 †Macrocyproides clermontensis
 †Macronotella
 †Macronotella arcta
 †Macronotella scofeldi
 †Macronotella scofieldi
 †Macropotamorhynchus
 †Macropotamorhynchus tuta
 †Macrostylocrinus
 †Macrostylocrinus compressus
 †Macrostylocrinus obpyramidalis – or unidentified comparable form
 †Macrostylocrinus vermiculatus
 †Manicrinus
  †Manticoceras
 †Manticoceras regulare
 †Manticrinus
 †Maquoketacrinus
 †Maquoketacrinus ornatus
 †Maratia
 †Maratia mara
 †Maratia micula
 †Marsupiocrinus
 †Marsupiocrinus primaevus
 †Mediospirifer
 †Megalomoidea
 †Megamyonia
 †Megamyonia unicostata
 †Megastrophia
 †Megastrophia profunda
 †Megistocrinus
 †Megistocrinus pernodosus
 †Melocrinites
 †Merista
  †Meristella
 †Meristella parva
 †Meristina
 †Merocrinus
 †Mesoblastus – or unidentified comparable form
 †Mesolobus
 †Metaconularia
 †Metalonchodina
 †Metalonchodina deflecta – type locality for species
 †Michelia
 †Michelinoceras
 †Microcardinalia
 †Milleratia
 †Milleratia cincinnatiensis
 †Milleratia cincinnattiensis
 †Mirifusella – type locality for genus
 †Mirifusella fortunata – type locality for species
 †Modiomorpha
 †Monomerella
 †Murchisonia
 †Myalina
 †Mycterops
 †Mycterops whitei – type locality for species
 †Myeinocystites
 †Myelodactylus
 †Mystrocephala
 †Mystrocephala pulchra – or unidentified comparable form
 †Mystrocephala raripustulosus
 †Mytilarca

N

 †Nactocrinus
 †Nalivkinia – tentative report
 †Nataliana – type locality for genus
 †Nataliana sinuata – type locality for species
  †Naticopsis
 †Naticopsis depressa – type locality for species
 †Neopanderodus
  †Neospirifer
 †Neozaphrentis
 †Neozaphrentis pellaensis
 †Nervostrophia
 †Nervostrophia calvini
 †Nervostrophia canace
 †Nervostrophia contaderoensis
 †Nervostrophia extensa
 †Nervostrophia multinervosa
 †Nervostrophia rockfordensis
 †Nervostrophia solida
 †Nervostrophia thomasi
 †Newberria
 †Newberria cordiforme
 †Newberria johanni
 †Ningulella
 †Ningulella paucisulcata
 †Nodambichilina
 †Nodambichilina symmetrica
 †Nucellangium
 †Nucellangium glabrum
 †Nucleospira
 †Nucleospira barrisi
   Nucula
 †Nucula glanparkensis
 †Nucula iowensis
 Nuculana
 †Nuculana sacata
 †Nuculites
 †Nuculites neglectus
 †Nuculopsis

O

  †Odontopleura
 †Oepikina
 †Oistodus
 †Oistodus venustus
 †Onniella
 †Onniella quadrata
    †Onychodus
 †Opikatia
 †Opikatia emaciata
 †Opikatia rotunda
 †Opoa
 †Orbiculoidea
 †Orbiculoidea telleri
 †Orbiculoidea varsoviensis
 †Orbiculoidea wardi
 †Orecopia
 †Orecopia circinatus – type locality for species
 †Oriostoma
  †Orthoceras
 †Orthoceras indianense
 †Orthodesma
 †Orthograptus
 †Orthograptus eucharis
 †Orthograptus truncatus
 †Orthonychia
 †Orthonychia vomerium
 †Orthospirifer
 †Orthospirifer capax
 †Orthospirifer euruteines
 †Orthospirifer iowensis
 †Orthospirifer parryanus
 †Orthotetes
 †Orthotetes kaskaskiensis
 †Otarion – tentative report
 †Oulodus
 †Oulodus abbreviata – type locality for species
 †Oulodus serratus
 †Ovatia
 †Ovatia laevicostata
 †Ovatia ovata
 †Ozarkodina
 †Ozarkodina campbelli – type locality for species
 †Ozarkodina delicatula
 †Ozarkodina raaschi

P

 †Pachyphyllum
 †Pachyphyllum crassicostatum
 †Pachyphyllum dumonti – type locality for species
 †Pachyphyllum gregarium
 †Pachyphyllum minutissimum
 †Pachyphyllum websteri
 †Pachyphyllum woodmani
 †Paladin
 †Paladin wilsoni
 †Palaeocapulus
 †Palaeocapulus equilateralis
 †Palaeoconcha
 †Palaeocyclus
 †Palaeoneilo
 †Palaeoneilo barrisi
 †Palaeoneilo fecunda
 †Palaeostachys
 †Palaeostachys andrewsii
 †Palaeozygopleura
 †Palaeozygopleura difficile
 †Palmatolepis
 †Palmatolepis foliacea
 †Palmatolepis semichatovae
 †Panderous
 †Panderous gracilis
 †Panderous panderi
 †Parabolbina
 †Parabolbina antecedans
 †Parabolbina carinifera
 †Parabolbina staufferi
 †Paracosmetocrinus
 †Paracyclas
 †Paracyclas dubia
 †Paracyclas dubius
 †Paracyclas elliptica
 †Paracyclas parvula
 †Paracyclas paucipleura
 †Paracyclas proavia
 †Paracyclas sabini
 †Paracyclas validalinea
 †Paracyclas validelinea
 †Paraphorhynchus
 †Paraphorhynchus elongatum
 †Paraphorhynchus striatocostatum
 †Paraschmidtella
 †Paraschmidtella irregularis
 †Paraschmidtella uphami
 †Parenthatia
 †Parenthatia camerata
 †Parenthatia punctata
 †Patellilabia
 †Patellilabia scriptiferus
 †Paucicrura
 †Paucicrura corpulenta
 †Paupospira
  †Peachocaris
 †Peachocaris acanthouraea – type locality for species
 †Pedomphalella
 †Pedomphalella intermedia
 †Pedomphalella subovata
 †Pentamerella
 †Pentamerella dubia
 †Pentamerella laeviscula
 †Pentamerella laeviuscula
 †Pentamerella magna
 †Pentamerella multicostella
 †Pentamerella obsolescens
 †Pentamerella rugosa
 †Pentamerella subarata
 †Pentameroides
 †Pentameroides corrugatus
 †Pentameroides subrectus
  †Pentamerus
 †Pentamerus oblongus
 †Pentlandina
  †Pentremites
 †Pentremites pulchellus
 †Perditocardinia
 †Perditocardinia iowensis – type locality for species
  †Periechocrinus
 †Pernopecten
 †Pernopecten cooperensis
 †Petalocrinus
 †Petalocrinus mirabilis
  †Petalodus
 †Petalodus allegheniensis
 †Petalotrypa
 †Petalotrypa formosa
 †Petrocrania
 †Petrocrania famelica
 †Petrocrania familica
 †Petrodus
 †Petrodus patelliformis
  †Phacops
 †Phacops iowensis
 †Phanerotrema
 †Philhedra
 †Philhedra sheldoni
 †Phillipsia
 †Phoebodus
 †Phoebodus densneptuni – type locality for species
 †Pholidostrophia
 †Pholidostrophia iowensis
 †Phragmoceras
 †Phragmodus
 †Phragmodus cognitus
 †Phragmodus undatus
 †Phricodothyris
 †Phymatopleura
 †Physonemus
 †Physonemus hamuspiscatorius
 †Physonemus pandatus
 †Piloricilla
 †Piloricilla sedaliensis
 †Pinnocaris
 †Pinnocaris americana – type locality for species
 †Pisocrinus
  †Plaesiomys
 †Plaesiomys subquadrata
 †Plagioglypta
 †Plagioglypta iowaensis
 †Planalvus – type locality for genus
 †Planalvus gibberosa – type locality for species
 †Plasmopora
   †Platyceras
 †Platyceras antiquum
 †Platyceras insolitum
 †Platyceras irrasum
 †Platyceras latum – tentative report
 †Platyceras nasutum
 †Platyceras paralium
  †Platycrinites
 †Platycrinus
 †Platylichas
 †Platyrachella
 †Platyrachella ballardi
 †Platyrachella macbridei
 †Platyschisma
 †Platyschisma barrisi
 †Platyschisma depressa
 †Platyschisma laudoni – type locality for species
  †Platystrophia
 †Platystrophia biforata
 †Plectatrypa
 †Plectodina
 †Plectodina aculeata
 †Plectodonta
 †Plectodonta produla
  †Pleurocystites
 †Pleurocystites beckeri
 †Pleurocystites filitextus – tentative report
 †Pleurocystites strimplei
  Pleurotomaria – tentative report
 †Pleurotomaria verticillata
 †Plicochonetes
 †Plicostricklandia
 †Podolithus
 †Poleumita
 †Polusocrinus
 †Polusocrinus rosa
  †Polygnathus
 †Polygnathus decorosus
 †Polygnathus intermedius
 †Polygnathus parawebbi
 †Polygnathus xylus
 †Polyplacognathus
 †Polyplacognathus ramosus
 †Polytryphocycloides
 †Polytylites
 †Polytylites wilsoni
 †Porcellia
 †Porcellia crassinoda
 †Porcellia obliquinoda
 †Porcellia rectinoda – type locality for species
 †Porocrinus
 †Porocrinus crassus
 †Porocrinus fayettensis
 †Porocrinus pentagonius
 †Porpites
 †Posidonia
 †Praecupulocrinus
 †Praecupulocrinus conjugans
 †Praenucula – tentative report
 †Praewaagenoconcha
 †Praewaagenoconcha speciosa
 †Prasopora
 †Prasoporina
 †Pregazacrinus
 †Pregazacrinus hemisphericus
 †Primitia
 †Primitia gibbera
 †Primitia spinata
 †Primitiella
 †Primitiella bellevuensis
 †Primitiella carlei
 †Primitiella constricta
 †Primitiella milleri
 †Primitiella plattevillensis
 †Primitiopsis – tentative report
 †Primitiopsis bella
 †Primitopsis – tentative report
 †Primitopsis bella
 †Priscella
 †Probillingsites
 †Productella
 †Productella belanskii
 †Productella camerata
 †Productella fragilis
 †Productella iowa
 †Productella linnensis
 †Productella perplana
 †Productella rugatula
 †Productella sericea
 †Productella subaculeata
 †Productella subalata
 †Productella thomasi
 †Productus
 †Productus arcuatus
 †Productus ovatus
 †Productus sedaliensis
 †Proetides
 †Proetides insignis
  †Proetus
 †Proetus channahonensis – or unidentified comparable form
 †Promexyele
 †Promexyele peyeri
 †Prospira
 †Prospira greenockensis – or unidentified related form
 †Prospira legrandensis
 †Protacrocrinus
 †Protatrypa
 †Protaxocrinus
 †Protoleptostrophia
 †Protoleptostrophia fragilis
 †Protomegastrophia
 †Protometgastrophia
 †Protoniella
 †Protoniella parva
 †Protoscolex
 †Pseudoammodiscus
 †Pseudoatrypa
 †Pseudoatrypa bentonensis
 †Pseudoatrypa blackhawkensis
 †Pseudoatrypa boyeri – or unidentified comparable form
 †Pseudoatrypa bremerensis
 †Pseudoatrypa devoniana
 †Pseudoatrypa minor
 †Pseudoatrypa percrassa
 †Pseudoatrypa rotunda
 †Pseudoatrypa rugatula
 †Pseudobelodina – tentative report
 †Pseudoconocardium
 †Pseudoglomospira
 †Pseudopalmula
 †Pseudopalmula palmuloides
 †Pseudoplagiothyra
 †Pseudoplagiothyra praecursor
 †Pseudozygopleura
 †Pseudulrichia
 †Pseudulrichia simplex
 †Pterinea
 †Ptychophyllum
 †Ptychopleurella
 †Ptychopleurella bouchardi – or unidentified comparable form
 †Ptychopteria
 †Ptychopteria chemungensis
 †Ptyctodopsis – type locality for genus
 †Ptyctodopsis menzeli – type locality for species
  †Ptyctodus
 †Pugnoides
 †Pugnoides calvini
 †Pugnoides ottumwa
 †Punctaparchites
 †Punctaparchites rugosus
 †Punctaparchites splendens
 †Punctospirifer
 †Punctospirifer solidirostris
 †Pycnostylus
 †Pyramiblastus
 †Pyramiblastus fusiformis – type locality for species
 †Pyrgocystis

Q

 †Quasibollia
 †Quasibollia ridicula
 †Quienquecaudex
 †Quienquecaudex springeri

R
 

 †Raphistomina
 †Raymondatia
 †Raymondatia goniglypta
 †Raymondatia gonigplyta
 †Raymondiata
 †Raymondiata goniglypta
 †Resserella
 †Retichonetes
 †Retichonetes brandonensis
 †Reticularia
 †Reticularia cooperensis
 †Retispira
 †Retispira bilabiatus
 †Retispira deflectus
 †Retispira exilis
 †Retispira perelegans
 †Retispira type locality for species Kues & Batten 2001 – informal
 †Rhaphanocrinus
 †Rhaphistomina
 †Rhineoderma
 †Rhineoderma dinglensis
 †Rhipidium
 †Rhipidomella
 †Rhipidomella cuneata
 †Rhipidomella dalyana – or unidentified comparable form
 †Rhipidomella tenuicostata
 †Rhipidomella thiemei
 †Rhodocrinites
 †Rhombopora
 †Rhynchodus
 †Rhynchopora
 †Rhynchopora pustulosa
 †Rhynchopora rowleyi
 †Rhynchotrema
 †Rhynchotreta
 †Rhyssochonetes
 †Rhyssochonetes bellarugosis
 †Rigidella
 †Ripidiorhynchus
 †Ripidiorhynchus cedarensis
 †Rugosochonetes
 †Rugosochonetes multicastatus

S

 †Saccelatia
 †Saccelatia angularis
 †Saccelatia arcuamuralis
 †Saccelatia arrecta
 †Saccelatia bullata
 †Saccelatia cletifera
 †Sanguinolites
 †Scaphelasma
 †Schellwienella
 †Schellwienella crenulicostata
 †Schellwienella inaequalis
 †Schellwienella inflata
 †Schellwienella planumbona
 †Schizoblastus
 †Schizoblastus roemeri
 †Schizodus
 †Schizodus sedaliensis
 †Schizodus trigonalis
 †Schizophoria
 †Schizophoria amanaensis
 †Schizophoria athabaskensis – or unidentified related form
 †Schizophoria athabaskiensis – or unidentified related form
 †Schizophoria chouteauensis
 †Schizophoria dorsata
 †Schizophoria floydensis
 †Schizophoria floydia
 †Schizophoria impressa
 †Schizophoria iowensis
 †Schizophoria landoni
 †Schizophoria lata
 †Schizophoria laudoni
 †Schizophoria macfarlanei
 †Schizophoria macfarlanii
 †Schizophoria minor
 †Schizophoria multistriata
 †Schizophoria subelliptica
 †Schmidtella
 †Schmidtella affinis
 †Schmidtella brevis
 †Schmidtella lacunosa
 †Schmidtella latimarginata
 †Schuchertella
 †Schuchertella acutistriata
 †Schuchertella altirostris
 †Schuchertella humboldtensis
 †Schuchertella iowensis
 †Schuchertella nodocostata
 †Schuchertella parva
 †Schuchertella pectiniformis
 †Scofielda
 †Scofielda bilateralis
 †Scofieldia
 †Scofieldia bilateralis
 †Scutellum
 †Scutellum depressum
 †Scutellum thomasi
  †Scytalocrinus
 †Selenella
 †Selenella pediculus
 †Semitextularia
 †Semitextularia thomasi
 †Septemchiton
 †Septemchiton iowaensis
 †Septemchiton iowensis
 †Septopora
 †Serpulospira
 †Serpulospira paradoxus – type locality for species
 †Setigerites
 †Shumardella
 †Sieberella – tentative report
 †Sieberella insolita
 †Sievertsia
 †Sigournea – type locality for genus
 †Sigournea multidentata – type locality for species
 †Similodonta
 †Similodonta obliqua
 †Simulodonta
 †Simulodonta obliqua
 †Sinuites
 †Sinuites subcompressa
 †Siphonocrinus
 †Siphonocrinus nobilis
 †Skenidioides – tentative report
 †Skenidium
 †Skenidium independense
 †Smithiphyllum
 †Smithiphyllum belanskii
 †Sowerbyella
 †Spathella
 †Sphaerirhynchia
  †Sphenothallus
 †Spinatrypa
 †Spinatrypa aspera
 †Spinatrypa augusticostata – or unidentified comparable form
 †Spinatrypa bellula
 †Spinatrypa borealis
 †Spinatrypa hystrix
 †Spinatrypa mascula
 †Spinatrypa occidentalis
 †Spinatrypa planosulcata
 †Spinatrypa rockfordensis
 †Spinatrypa trulla
 †Spinatrypina
 †Spinatrypina angusticostata – or unidentified comparable form
 †Spinatrypina edmundsi
 †Spinocarinifera
 †Spinocarinifera arcuata
 †Spinocarinifera arcuatus
 †Spinocyrtia
 †Spinocyrtia alta
 †Spinocyrtia ballardi
 †Spinocyrtia capax
 †Spinocyrtia cedarensis
 †Spinocyrtia corvirostra
 †Spinocyrtia curvirostra
 †Spinocyrtia cyrtiformis
 †Spinocyrtia cyrtinaformis
 †Spinocyrtia iowensis
 †Spinocyrtia macbridei
 †Spinocyrtia pulchra
 †Spinocyrtia westerensis
 †Spinulicosta
 †Spinulicosta spinulicosta
  †Spirifer
 †Spirifer biplicoides
 †Spirifer forbesi
 †Spirifer gregeri
 †Spirifer legrandensis
 †Spirifer louisianensis
 †Spirifer marshallensis
 †Spirifer missouriensis
 †Spirifer orestes
 †Spirifer platynotus
 †Spirifer stratiformis
  †Spiriferina
 †Spiriferina solidirostris
 †Spiriferina solidirostrus
 †Spiriferina subtexta
 †Spirinella
  Spirorbis
 †Spyroceras
 †Stachyodes
 †Stachyodes costulata
 †Stainbrookia
 †Stainbrookia infera
 †Staufferella
 †Staufferella falcata
 †Stegocoelia
 †Stegocoelia quadricincta – type locality for species
 †Stenopareia
 †Stenopareia slocomi – or unidentified comparable form
 †Stenopareiea
 †Stephanocrinus
 †Stereostylus
 †Stereostylus aages – type locality for species
     †Stethacanthus
 †Stethacanthus depressus
 †Stethacanthus erectus
 †Stictopora
 †Stictostroma
 †Stictostroma ordinarium
 †Straparollus
 †Straparollus ammon
 †Straparollus argutus – type locality for species
 †Straparollus cyclostomus
 †Straparollus macromphalus
 †Streptelasma
 †Streptelasma trilobatum – or unidentified comparable form
 †Streptis
 †Streptognathodus
 †Streptognathodus delicatulus – type locality for species
 †Streptognathodus symmetricus – type locality for species
 †Streptorhynchus
 †Streptorhynchus tenuicostatum
 †Striatochonetes
 †Striatochonetes buchananensis
 †Striatochonetes schucherti
 †Striatopora
 †Striatopora iowensis
 †Stricklandia
 †Stricklandia laevis
 †Stricklandia lens
 †Striispirifer
 †Strimplecrinus
 †Strobilocystites
 †Stromatopora
 †Strophalosia
 †Strophodonta
 †Strophodonta umbonata
 †Stropholosia
 †Stropholosia littletonensis
   †Strophomena
 †Strophomena abnormalis
 †Strophomena biplacata
 †Strophomena cedarensis
 †Strophomena cicatricosa
 †Strophomena costata
 †Strophomena dorsata
 †Strophomena erratica
 †Strophomena halli
 †Strophomena iowensis
 †Strophomena linderi
 †Strophomena littleonensis
 †Strophomena littletonensis
 †Strophomena masonensis
 †Strophomena mineolaensis
 †Strophomena nortoni
 †Strophomena parva
 †Strophomena perarcuata
 †Strophomena planodorsata
 †Strophomena plicata
 †Strophomena quadratella
 †Strophomena randalia
 †Strophomena reticulata
 †Strophomena scottensis
 †Strophomena solonensis
 †Strophomena subdemissa
 †Strophomena thomasi
 †Strophomena trilobata – type locality for species
 †Strophomena unbonata
 †Strophomena vera
 †Strophonella
 †Strophonelloides
 †Strophonelloides reversa
 †Strophostylus
 †Strophostylus bivolve
 †Stylonema – tentative report
 †Sublobalocrinus
 †Sublobalocrinus kasseri
 †Sulcatostrophia
 †Sulcatostrophia camerata
 †Sulcatostrophia euglyphea
 †Sygcaulocrinus
 †Sygcaulocrinus typus
  †Syringopora
 †Syringostroma – tentative report
 †Syringostroma confertum
 †Syringothyris
 †Syringothyris halli
 †Syringothyris hannibalensis
 †Syringothyris newarkensis

T

 †Tabulophyllum
 †Tabulophyllum buccinum – type locality for species
 †Tabulophyllum curtum – type locality for species
 †Tabulophyllum ehlersi
 †Tabulophyllum ellipticum
 †Tabulophyllum expansum
 †Tabulophyllum levorsoni – type locality for species
 †Tabulophyllum longum
 †Tabulophyllum magnum
 †Tabulophyllum mutabile – type locality for species
 †Tabulophyllum ponderosum
 †Tabulophyllum rectum
 †Tabulophyllum robustum
 †Tabulophyllum rotundum
 †Tabulophyllum solidum
 †Tanaocystis
 †Tanaocystis type locality for species – informal
 †Tarphyphyllum
 †Tarphyphyllum cylindricum – type locality for species
  †Taxocrinus
 †Tecnocyrtina
 †Tecnocyrtina curvilineata
 †Tecnocyrtina missouriensis
 †Tenticospirifer
 †Tenticospirifer cyrtinaeformis
 †Tenticospirifer cyrtinaformis
 †Tenticospirifer shellrockensis
 †Tetradella
 †Tetradella carinata
 †Tetradella ellipsilira
 †Tetradella septinoda
 †Tetradella subquadrans
 †Tetradella ulrichi
 †Teutonophon
 †Teutonophon tangentialis
 †Thaerodonta
 †Thaerodonta recedens
 †Thalamocrinus
 †Theleproktocrinus
 †Theleproktocrinus davidsoni
 †Theodissa
 †Theodissa hungerfordi
 †Theodossia
 †Theodossia hungerfordi
 †Thomasaria
 †Thomasaria altumbona
 †Thomasatia
 †Thomasatia falcicosta
 †Thomasocrinus
 †Thomasocrinus cylindrica
 †Timeischytes
 †Torynifer
 †Trachydomia
 †Trachydomia variata
 †Tranodis
 †Trapezophyllum
 †Tremanotus
 †Trichinocrinus
 †Trigeria
 †Trimerella
 †Triplesia
 †Trochonema
 †Tropidodiscus
 †Trupetustroma
 †Trupetustroma bassleri
 †Trupetustroma hayense
 †Tubisalebra
 †Turbonopsis
 †Turbonopsis hackberryensis
 †Turbonopsis spiculatus – type locality for species
 †Tylothyris
 †Tylothyris bimesialis
 †Tylothyris inultilis
 †Tylothyris megista
 †Tylothyris mesacostalis
 †Tylothyris rockfordensis
 †Tylothyris subattenuatta
 †Tylothyris subvaricosa
 †Tylothyris sulcocostata

U

 †Ulocrinus
 †Ulrichia
 †Ulrichia saccula
 †Unispirifer
 †Unispirifer minnewankensis – or unidentified comparable form
 †Unispirifer platynotus

V

 †Variatrypa
 †Variatrypa arctica
 †Variatrypa lineata
 †Variatrypa rugatula
 †Verkhotomia – tentative report
 †Verkhotomia calvini

W

 †Waagenella
 †Waagenella sowerbyi – tentative report
 †Warrenella
 †Warrenella extensa
 †Warthia
 †Wellerella
 †Westerna
 †Westerna gigantea
 †Whatcheeria – type locality for genus
 †Whatcheeria deltae – type locality for species
 †Whidbornella
 †Whidbornella lachrymosa
 †Whitfieldella
 †Winchellatia
 †Winchellatia lansingensis
 †Winchellatia longispina
 †Winchellatia minnesotensis
 †Worthenia

Y

 †Youngia

Z

 †Zaphrenthis
 †Zaphrenthis calceola
 †Zaphrenthis cliffordana
 †Zygobolboides
 †Zygobolboides calvini
 †Zygobolboides grafensis
 †Zygobolboides iowensis
 †Zygobolboides thomasi
 †Zygospira
 †Zygospira resupinata

References
 

Paleozoic
Iowa